Caminho das Árvores is a neighborhood located in the southeastern zone of Salvador, Bahia in Brazil. This neighborhood is a mixed of residential and trade area, with majority presence of wealthy classes.

Caminho Das Arvores